Warhorse is the debut album by English hard rock band  Warhorse. The album was re-released on vinyl in 1984 under the name Vulture Blood.

Track listing 
All songs written by Warhorse, except where noted.
 "Vulture Blood" – 6:13
 "No Chance" – 6:22
 "Burning" – 6:17
 "St. Louis" – 3:50 (Easybeats cover; written by George Young & Harry Vanda)
 "Ritual" – 4:54
 "Solitude" – 8:48
 "Woman of the Devil" – 7:16

Re-issue bonus tracks 
 "Ritual" (live)
 "Miss Jane" (Demo) 
 "Solitude" (live)
 "Woman of the Devil" (live)
 "Burning" (live)

Personnel 
 Ashley Holt – vocals
 Ged Peck – guitar
 Mac Poole – drums
 Nick Simper – bass
 Frank Wilson – keyboards

References

External links
 The Deep Purple Podcast - Episode #22 - Warhorse - Warhorse

Warhorse (British band) albums
1970 debut albums
Vertigo Records albums